Bietingen station is a railway station in Bietingen, in the municipality of Gottmadingen, in Baden-Württemberg, Germany. It is located on the standard gauge High Rhine Railway of Deutsche Bahn.

Customs
Bietingen is, for customs purposes, a border station for passengers arriving from Switzerland. Customs checks may be performed in the station or on board trains by German officials. Systematic passport controls were abolished when Switzerland joined the Schengen Area in 2008.

Services
 the following services stop at Bietingen:

References

External links
 
 

Railway stations in Baden-Württemberg
Buildings and structures in Konstanz (district)